Renaissance is a science fiction novel by American writer Raymond F. Jones. The novel was originally serialized in the magazine Astounding in 1944. It was published in 1951 by Gnome Press in an edition of 4,000 copies.  It was reprinted by Pyramid Books in 1963 and subsequently under the title Man of Two Worlds.

Plot introduction
The story concerns two worlds:  the remnants of Earth, which has been destroyed, and Kronweld, which exists in another plane.

Reception
P. Schuyler Miller described Renaissance as "a strangely moving book, overcoming its lack of characterization and other traditional shortcomings by [its] drive and sweep of imagination."

References

Sources

External links 
 

1944 American novels
1944 science fiction novels
American science fiction novels
Novels by Raymond F. Jones
Novels first published in serial form
Works originally published in Analog Science Fiction and Fact
Gnome Press books